Doon may refer to:

Arts and entertainment
"Doon" (lai), a 13th-century Breton lai
Doon de Mayence, a fictional hero of the Old French chansons de geste
Doon Harrow, a character in the novel The City of Ember and its film adaptation
National Lampoon's Doon, a novel by Ellis Weiner, parodying Frank Herbert's Dune

People
Doon Arbus (born 1945), American writer and journalist
Doon Mackichan (born 1962), British actress and comedian
Doon Naughton (1879–1964), New Zealand cricketer

Places

India
Doon (Vidhan Sabha constituency), Himachal Pradesh
Doon Valley, a valley in the Sivalik foothills of the Himalayas

Ireland
Doon, County Cavan, three townlands, including:
Doon (Drumreilly)
Doon (Tomregan)
Doon, County Limerick
Doon, County Offaly
Doon, County Westmeath, a townland in Lickbla civil parish

Scotland
Loch Doon
River Doon

United States
Doon, California, a settlement on the defunct Butte County Railroad
Doon, Iowa

Elsewhere
Doon, Ontario, Canada, a neighbourhood of Kitchener
Doon, Iran, a village in Hormozgan Province
Doon River, New Zealand
Doon, County Londonderry, a townland in County Londonderry, Northern Ireland
Doon, a crater on Mars

Schools
Doon Academy, a secondary school in Dalmellington, Scotland
Doon International School (disambiguation), three schools in India
Doon Public School, a private secondary school in Paschim Vihar, Delhi, India
Doon University, in Dehradun, Uttarakhand, India
The Doon School, a private boarding school in Dehradun, Uttarakhand, India

Other uses
Doon GAA, a Gaelic Athletic Association club in Doon, County Limerick, Ireland
HMS Doon, three ships of the British Royal Navy, including:
HMS Doon (1904), a destroyer

See also
Doone, a surname
Dune (disambiguation)